Ad-Da'i Yusuf (died September 12, 1012) was an imam of the Zaidi state in Yemen who ruled for two highly turbulent terms (977–999, 1002–1012).

Struggles against Yu'firids and Ziyadids

Yusuf bin Yahya was a son of the imam al-Mansur Yahya who died in 1976. In the following year, Yusuf was proclaimed with the regnal name ad-Da'i Yusuf. His early years were filled with struggles against the Yu'firid Dynasty that ruled much of the Yemeni highland. The important city San'a at this time was subjected to the overlordship of the Sunni Ziyadid dynasty which ruled the Tihamah from its base in Zabid. Ad-Da'i Yusuf managed to gain recognition as prince in San'a and the surrounding province in 978, reciting the khutbah in his own name. Nevertheless, the Ziyadid governor Ibn ad-Dahhak soon fought back. The last effective Yu'firid ruler Abdallah managed to win back the city and increase his power still by invading the Ziyadid domains and seize Zabid. After Abdallah's death in 997, Yu'firid rule collapsed.

Contested leadership

For ad-Da'i Yusuf, this was but a brief respite. A rival for the imamate, al-Mansur al-Qasim al-Iyyani appeared in 999. With the assistance of the Hamdan tribesmen, ad-Da'i Yusuf was expelled from Sa'dah, the traditional seat of the imams. A Zaidi Sharif, al-Qasim bin al-Husayn, was dispatched to San'a by the new imam, and the Zaydiyyah communities submitted to him. After some years, al-Qasim bin al-Husayn changed his allegiance to ad-Da'i Yusuf again. Al-Mansur al-Qasim al-Iyyani retired from power in 1002, and ad-Da'i Yusuf ruled for a second term. However, his time was filled with petty fighting over San'a, where the tribesmen of Hamdan and Khawlan played a major role. He also had to fight al-Mansur's son who posed as imam under the name al-Mahdi al-Husayn. This uneasy situation persisted until the death of ad-Da'i Yusuf in 1012, after an extremely turbulent reign.

See also

 Imams of Yemen
 Rassids

References

Zaydi imams of Yemen
1012 deaths
Year of birth unknown
10th century in Yemen
11th century in Yemen
10th-century Arabs
11th-century Arabs
Rassid dynasty